Marcelo Arévalo and Jean-Julien Rojer defeated Ivan Dodig and Austin Krajicek in the final, 6–7(4–7), 7–6(7–5), 6–3 to win the men's doubles tennis title at the 2022 French Open. They saved three championship points en route to winning their first major title as a team and their third overall title together. With his maiden major title, Arévalo became the first men's doubles major champion from Central America, and at 40 years of age, Rojer became the oldest men's doubles major champion in the Open Era with his third major men's doubles title.

Pierre-Hugues Herbert and Nicolas Mahut were the defending champions, but lost in the first round to Sander Gillé and Joran Vliegen.

Mate Pavić was vying to complete the career Golden Slam, but lost in the third round to Rohan Bopanna and Matwé Middelkoop.

This was the first men's doubles major tournament in the Open Era where all eight teams in the quarterfinals consisted of players from different countries.

Seeds

Draw

Finals

Top half

Section 1

Section 2

Bottom half

Section 3

Section 4

Seeded teams 
The following are the seeded teams, based on ATP rankings as of 16 May 2022.

Other entry information

Wildcards

Alternates

Withdrawals
  Simone Bolelli /  Fabio Fognini → replaced by  Tomás Martín Etcheverry /  Alejandro Tabilo
  Francisco Cabral /  Holger Rune → replaced by  Sander Arends /  Szymon Walków
  Dan Evans /  Jonny O'Mara → replaced by  Adrian Mannarino /  Albano Olivetti
  Richard Gasquet /  Jo-Wilfried Tsonga → replaced by  Jonny O'Mara /  Jackson Withrow
  Roman Jebavý /  Alex Molčan → replaced by  Roman Jebavý /  Matej Sabanov
  Julio Peralta /  Franko Škugor → replaced by  Denys Molchanov /  Franko Škugor
  Sam Querrey /  Hunter Reese → replaced by  Ramkumar Ramanathan /  Hunter Reese

References

External links
Main draw

French Open - Doubles
Men's Doubles